The Ames Building was Boston, Massachusetts's first skyscraper.

Ames Building may also refer to:

Ames Building (Dedham, Massachusetts), U.S.
Ames Research Center, of NASA, at Moffett Field, California, U.S.

See also
 Ames (disambiguation)